The Nautical Institute (NI) is an international professional organisation for maritime professionals, based in the United Kingdom.  It was established in 1971 and has the status of a company limited by guarantee and is registered with the Charity Commission. It has over 7,000  members in over 110 countries.  It publishes a members' newsletter "Seaways" and organizes meetings.

There are four levels of membership for qualified maritime professionals;
Fellow (FNI)
Associate Fellow (AFNI)
Member (MNI)
Associate Member (AMNI)

References

External links
NI Website
alert

1971 establishments in the United Kingdom
Maritime organizations
Organisations based in the London Borough of Lambeth
Organizations established in 1971
Professional associations based in the United Kingdom